Nana Meskhidze (Georgian: ნანა მესხიძე; 13 March 1936 – 31 August 1997), was an artist of Georgia. She participated in many exhibitions.

Biography 
Meskhidze was born on 13 March 1936 in Tbilisi. Her father was Archil Meskhidze who was the conductor of the Georgian folk music choir and his mother was Anna Avlokhashvili, an artist with the Marjanishvili Theater. In 1944 she went to Ilia Chavchavadze Women's High School and in 1951 she started her studies with Iakob Nikoladze at the art school in Tbilisi. In 1957 she studied at the Tbilisi Academy of Fine Arts.

In 1963 Meskhidze left and began participating in exhibitions where the main theme of her works are Сhildren and Motherhood. In 1965 she became a member of USSR Union of Artists and in 1977 she was an honoured artist of the Georgian republic. Meskhidze was one of the "Five Georgian Artists" who created an exhibition in Moscow in 1977. The other artists were Radish Tordia, Givi Narmania, Zurab Razmadze and Bezhan Shvelidze.

Meskhidze has paintings in museums of the Georgia and Russian Federation. Meskhidze died on August 31, 1997 in Tbilisi.

Works 
 "Brother and Sister" (1963)
 "My Father" (1965)
 "Play" (1965)
 "Four of Them" (1966)
 "Girls" (1967)
 "Mothers" (1968)
 "Birth" (1969)
 "Day of Victory" (1970)
 "Children at the Beach" (1971)
 "Tennis Player Girls" (1971)
 "Self Portrait with Children" (1973)
 "In Museum" (1975)
 "In the Field (Idyll)" (1975)

Exhibitions and creative trips 
1963 - Exhibition attributed to International Women's Day
1966 - Exhibition of young artist's artworks in Tbilisi National Gallery
1967 - Second all-union exhibition "Training and sport in art works"
1967 - Exhibition of soviet art works in Japan
1968 - Creative trip in Romania
1968 - World festival of Youngs and Students in Sofia
1968 - "Young artists of USSR" exhibition in German Democratic Republic
1968 - "Young artists of USSR" exhibition in Hungary
1977 - Painting exhibition of Five Georgian Artists in Moscow
1977 - Painting exhibition of Five Georgian Artists in Iraq
1978 - Painting exhibition of Five Georgian Artists in Syria
1978 - Creative trip of Special Group of Artist in Italy and Malta
1978 - Creative trip of Special Group of Artist in German Democratic Republic
1979 - Creative trip in Baltic
1979 - International Symposium of Five Democratic Countries Artists in Prague
1982 - Creative trip in Finland
1983 - Personal exhibition in Tbilisi Triumphal Center
1990 - Creative trip and two exhibitions in Palanga, Lithuania

Bibliography 

L. Khakhmigerashvili - Spring colors invite ("Tbilisi" newspaper, March 15, 1963)
”On Guard for Peace” visual art exhibition of Georgia (Catalogue. Tbilisi, 1965)
"On Guard for Peace" national exhibition (Catalogue. "Sovetski khudozhnik", Moscow, 1965)
Nana Meskhidze (Booklet. ”Khelovneba”, Tbilisi, 1973)
30 anniversary of great victory (Catalogue. Tbilisi, 1975)
V. Beridze, N. Ezerskaya - Art of Soviet Georgia. 1921-1970 (Moscow, 1975)
Grigor Parusidze - Only heart I expanse for You ("Druzhba narodov" magazine, #2, 1975)
"Glory to Labor" the National Exhibition (Catalogue. "Sovetski khudozhnik", Moscow, 1976)
Otar Egadze - Among the Artists (Tbilisi, 1976)
Painting Exhibition of Five Georgian Artists (Catalogue. Moscow, 1977)
Moris Potskhishvili - Grace of Maternity ("Saqartvelos qali" magazine, №1, 1983)
PALANGA 90 (Catalogue. 1990)

References

1997 deaths
1936 births
Women painters from Georgia (country)
20th-century painters from Georgia (country)
20th-century women artists
Artists from Tbilisi